Albert E Beyer (June 13, 1859 – October 29, 1929) was a United States Navy Coxswain who received the Medal of Honor for actions during the Battle of Cienfuegos during the Spanish–American War. He was one of 52 sailors and marines awarded the medal for actions during that battle. Albert is buried in the Mount Moriah Cemetery in Yeadon, Pennsylvania, in the Naval Asylum plot.

Medal of Honor citation
Rank and Organization: Coxswain, United States Navy. Born: June 13, 1859, Hanover, Germany. Entered Service At: Boston, Mass. G.O. No.: 521, July 7, 1899.

Citation:
On board the U.S.S. Nashville during the cutting of the cable leading from Cienfuegos, Cuba, May 11, 1898. Facing the heavy fire of the enemy, Beyer set an example of extraordinary bravery and coolness throughout this action.

See also

 List of Medal of Honor recipients for the Spanish–American War

Footnotes

References
 
  

1859 births
1929 deaths
American military personnel of the Spanish–American War
Burials at Mount Moriah Cemetery (Philadelphia)
German-born Medal of Honor recipients
Hanoverian emigrants to the United States
Spanish–American War recipients of the Medal of Honor
United States Navy Medal of Honor recipients
United States Navy sailors